Tollmann's bolide hypothesis is a hypothesis presented by Austrian palaeontologist Edith Kristan-Tollmann and geologist Alexander Tollmann in 1994. The hypothesis postulates that one or several bolides (asteroids or comets) struck the Earth around 7640 ± 200 years BCe, with a much smaller one approximately 3150 ± 200 BCE. The hypothesis tries to explain early Holocene extinctions and possibly legends of the Universal Deluge.

The claimed evidence for the event includes stratigraphic studies of tektites,<ref name="Izokh1988">Izokh, E.P., 1988, Age-paradox and the Origin of Tektites in J. Konta, ed., 2nd international conference on natural glasses Abstracts – International Conference on Natural Glasses-Prague, Czechoslovakia, 1988. v. 2, pp. 379–384.</ref> dendrochronology, and ice cores (from Camp Century, Greenland) containing hydrochloric acid and sulfuric acid (indicating an energetic ocean strike) as well as nitric acids (caused by extreme heating of air).

Christopher Knight and Robert Lomas in their book, Uriel's Machine, argue that the 7640 BCE evidence is consistent with the dates of formation of a number of extant salt flats and lakes in dry areas of North America and Asia. They argue that these lakes are the remains of multiple-kilometer-high waves that penetrated deeply into continents as the result of oceanic strikes that they proposed occurred. Research by Quaternary geologists, palynologists, and others has been unable to confirm the validity of the hypothesis and proposes more frequently occurring geological processes for some of the data used for the hypothesis. The dating of ice cores and Australasian tektites has shown long time span differences between the proposed impact times and the impact ejecta products.

 Scientific evaluation 
Quaternary geologists, paleoclimatologists, and planetary geologists specialising in meteorite and comet impacts have rejected Tollmann's bolide hypothesis. They reject this hypothesis because:

 The evidence offered to support the hypothesis can more readily be explained by more mundane and less dramatic geologic processes
 Many of the events alleged to be associated with this impact occurred at the wrong time (i.e., many of the events occurred hundreds to thousands of years before or after the hypothesized impacts); and
 There is a lack of any credible physical evidence for the cataclysmic environmental devastation and characteristic deposits that kilometre-high tsunamis would have created had they actually occurred.

Evidence used by proponents of the Tollmann's bolide hypothesis to argue for catastrophic Holocene extinctions have alternative explanations by more frequently occurring geological processes. The chemical composition and presence of volcanic ash with the specific acidity spikes in the Greenland ice cores shows evidence that they result from volcanic instead of impact origins.Zielinski, G.A., P.A. Mayewski, L.D. Meeker, S. Whitlow, and M.S. Twickler, 1996, A 110,000-year record of explosive volcanism from the GISP2 (Greenland) ice core. Quaternary Research. v. 45, no. 2, pp. 109–118. Also, the largest acidity spikes found in Antarctica ice cores have been dated to 17,300 to 17,500 BP, which is significantly older than hypothetical Holocene impacts. The formation of modern salt lakes and salt flats is explained by the concentration of salts and other evaporite minerals by the evaporation of water from stream-fed lakes lacking external outlets, called endorheic lakes, which commonly occur in arid climates on both hemispheres on Earth. The composition of the salts and other evaporite minerals found in these lakes is consistent with their precipitation from dissolved material continually carried into the lakes by rivers and streams and subsequent concentration by evaporation, instead of evaporation of seawater.Spencer, R.J., Eugster, H.P., and Jones, B.F., 1985, Geochemistry of Great Salt Lake, Utah II: Pleistocene-Holocene evolution. Geochimica et Cosmochimica Acta. v. 49, no. 3, pp. 739–747. Whether a lake becomes salty or not depends on whether the lake lacks an outlet and the relative balance between the inflow and outflow of lake waters via evaporation. Ocean water accessing a continental lake as the result of a single catastrophic event, as Tollmann's hypothesis proposes, would contain an inadequate amount of dissolved minerals to produce, when evaporated, the vast quantities of salts and other evaporites found in the salt lakes, flats, and pans cited as evidence of a mega-tsunami by this hypothesis.

 Geological criticism 
 Isostatic rebound 

Many published papersPeltier, W.R., 2002, Global  glacial isostatic adjustment: Palaeogeodetic and space-geodetic tests of the ICE-4G (VM2) model. Journal of Quaternary Science. v. 17, no. 5–6, pp. 491–510. demonstrate that isostatic depression of the Earth's crust happened in the early Holocene. This process has led to submerging substantial portions of coastal areas adjacent to continental ice sheets and resulted in the accumulations of marine sediments and fossils within them. A well-documented example of flooding caused by isostatic depression is the case of Charlotte, The Vermont Whale, a fossil whale found in the deposits of the former Champlain Sea. Like many similar marine deposits, the sediments, which accumulated within the Champlain Sea lack the physical characteristics; i.e. sedimentary structures, interlayers, and textures, that characterise sediments deposited by a mega-tsunami. These deposits and the associated fossils have been dated to significantly earlier periods than the times the bolide hypothesis proposed. In the case of the Champlain Sea, its sediments started to accumulate around 13,000 BP, almost 3,400 years before the oldest of the hypothesized Holocene bolide impacts.

 Dating 

A significant amount of the physical evidence used by Kristan-Tollmann and Tollmann, as supporting their hypothesis, is either too old or too young to have been created by this hypothesized impact. In many cases, it is hundreds to thousands, and in one case hundreds of thousands, of years too old to be credible evidence of a Holocene impact. The research that dates the tektites, which Tollmann's bolide hypothesis regards as indicative for the timing of the impact, is outdated. Later research,Shoemaker E.M., and H.R. Uhlherr, 1999, Stratigraphic relations of australites in the Port Campbell Embayment, Victoria. Meteoritics & Planetary Science. v. 34, no. 3, pp. 369–384. has dated the Australasian tektites to the Middle Pleistocene; about 790,000 years BP. In addition, the formation of salt lakes and salt flats is neither synchronous nor consistent with the hypothesized impacts having occurred about either 9,640 BP or 5,150 BP. For example, in the case of Lake Bonneville, Lake Lahontan, Mono Lake, and other Pleistocene pluvial lakes in the western United States, the transition to salt lakes and salt flats occurred at different times between 12,000 and 16,000 BP. Thus, the change from freshwater to salty water and eventually salt flats started over 2,400 to 6,400 years before the oldest of the impacts hypothesized by the Tollmann bolide hypothesis occurred. As a result, it is impossible that the formation of these salt lakes could have been associated with the impact hypothesized by Kristan-Tollmann and Tollmann.

 Megatsunami 

There exists a lack of credible physical evidence of either multiple-kilometer-high tsunami waves penetrating deeply into continents, and the ecological devastation these would have caused. Thousands of paleoenvironmental records constructed from the study of lakes, bogs, mires, and river valleys all over the world by palynologists have not shown the existence of such a megatsunami. In the case of North America, research published by various authorsJacobson, G.L., Jr., T. Webb, III, and E.E. Grimm, 1987, Patterns and rates of vegetational change during the deglaciation of North America. in W. F. Ruddiman and H. E. Wright, Jr., eds., pp. 277–287. North America Adjacent Oceans During the Last Deglaciation. The Geology of North America. K-3. Geological Society of America, Boulder, Colorado.Grimm, E.C. and G.L. Jacobson, Jr., 2004,  Late Quaternary vegetation history of the eastern United States. in Gillespie, A.R.,  S.C. Porter, and B.F. Atwater, eds., pp. 381–402. The Quaternary Period in the United States – Developments in Quaternary Science, Amsterdam, Elsevier.  provides detailed records of paleoenvironmental changes that have occurred throughout the last 10,000 to 15,000 years as reconstructed from pollen and other paleoenvironmental data from over a thousand sites throughout North America. These records do not recognise indications of either a resulting catastrophic environmental devastation or layers of tsunami deposits, which the mega-tsunamis postulated by Tollmann's bolide hypothesis would have created. Paleovegetation mapsOverpeck, J.T., R.S. Webb, and T. Webb., 1992. Mapping eastern North American vegetation change over the past 18,000 years: no-analogs and the future. Geology. v. 20, no. 12, pp. 1071–1074. illustrate a distinct lack of the dramatic changes in North American paleovegetation during the Holocene, which would be expected from the cataclysmic ecological and physical destruction that a continental-wide mega-tsunamis would have certainly have caused.

Grimm et al. in a paper published in Science'' in 1993, documented a 50,000-year-long record of environmental change by the analysis of pollen from an  core from Lake Tulane in Highland county, Florida. Because of the low-lying nature of the peninsula, in which this part of Florida lies, this lake and the area around it would have been flooded and covered by tsunami deposits along with many of the other lakes and bogs described in their, and other publications. The forests and associated ecosystems of these areas would have been flooded and completely destroyed by the mega-tsunamis proposed by Kristan-Tollmann and Tollmann. Despite its location, both the core and the pollen record recovered from Lake Tulane lacks any indication of an abrupt, catastrophic environmental disruption, which the mega-tsunamis proposed by Tollmann's bolide hypothesis would have caused. Sedimentary cores obtained from Florida and other locations also lack sedimentary layers that have the characteristics of sediments deposited by either tsunamis or mega-tsunamis.

The cataclysmic scale of physical and ecological destruction that a megatsunami, like the one proposed by Kristan-Tollmann and Tollmann, would have caused, has not been recognised within the majority of long-term environmental records. Over a thousand cores from North America for which Holocene paleoclimatic and paleoenvironmental records have been reconstructed do not show evidence for the drastic environmental changes resulting from a large Holocene impact. There is a similar lack of evidence for mega-tsunami-related, Holocene, catastrophic environmental disruptions, and deposits reported from environmental records reconstructed from thousands of locations from all over the world. Other megatsunamis have been shown in coastal sediments analysed by geologists and palynologists and point to tsunamis locally caused by either earthquake, volcanic eruptions, or submarine slides. These non-impact related tsunamis show abundant records of their environmental effects through the study of pollen from cores and exposures.

Members of the Holocene Impact Working Group have published papers advocating the occurrence of mega-tsunamis created by extraterrestrial impacts at various times during the Holocene and Late Pleistocene. However, none of these proposed impacts match either the cataclysmic scale or timing proposed by Kristan-Tollmann and Tollmann for their hypothesized bolide.

See also 

 Timeline of environmental events
 Younger Dryas impact hypothesis

References

External links 
 Pinter, N., and S.E. Ishman, 2008, Impacts, mega-tsunami, and other extraordinary claims PDF version, 304 KB. GSA Today. vol. 18, no. 1, pp. 37–38.

Historical geology
Hypothetical impact events
Extinction events